The 2017 Southern Conference women's basketball tournament was held between Thursday, March 2 and Sunday, March 5 in Asheville, North Carolina, at the U.S. Cellular Center.

Seeds
Teams are seeded by record within the conference, with a tiebreaker system to seed teams with identical conference records.

Schedule
All tournament games are nationally televised on an ESPN network:

Bracket

All-Tournament teams
First Team
Tianna Tarter, ETSU
KeKe Calloway, Mercer
Kahlia Lawrence, Mercer
Sydni Means, Mercer
Jasmine Joyner, Chattanooga

Second Team
Cierra Carter, Furman
Mangela Ngandjui, UNCG
Nadine Soliman, UNCG
Lakelyn Bouldin, Chattanooga
Chelsey Shumpert, Chattanooga

Most Outstanding Player
Jasmine Joyner, Chattanooga

Source:

References

See also
2017 Southern Conference men's basketball tournament

2016–17 Southern Conference women's basketball season
SoCon women's
College basketball tournaments in North Carolina
SoCon women's
Southern Conference women's basketball tournament
Southern Conference women's basketball tournament
Southern Conference women's basketball tournament